The Tesco Hudl was a tablet computer launched by British retailer Tesco in 2013. The device featured a seven-inch screen, a 1.5 GHz quad-core processor and 16 GB of internal flash memory (expandable up to 64 GB). The Hudl ran the Android Jelly Bean operating system and was manufactured by Wistron.

In April 2014, it was announced that Tesco had sold 500,000 Hudl tablets since launch, and a new model was planned. The second generation Hudl 2 was announced in October 2014. However, in October 2015 the brand was discontinued.

Rooting
The Tesco Hudl was mostly vanilla Android with only some vendor customisation, and therefore could be rooted. The root required users to flash an altered file which grants root permissions.

Accessories
A range of accessories were available for the device, including a leather case, a soft-touch case, ear-bud headphones, children's headphones, a protective bumper case, a screen protection kit and recharging cables.

Discontinuation and Server Shut Down
On the 26 June 2020 one of Tesco's main support server SSL certificates expired and Tesco did not renew it. This meant that whilst the server was still available, technical workarounds were required in order to access it. This does not effect the day-to-day use of the Hudl tablet, but causes massive problems when a factory reset is performed. During part of the start up process the tablet attempts to access this server, but the attempt is always unsuccessful (because of the invalid SSL certificate). This effectively blocks the start up process and completely bricks the device. The error is displayed as a WiFi problem. As stated, there are workarounds that can fix the problem (by changing the system date on the tablet), but they will only work for as long as the Tesco server remains operational - a Tesco server switch off is an inevitability with an unknown timeframe. For this reason it is strongly recommended that users do not factory reset Hudl devices.

References

External links 

 

Tablet computers
Tesco
Touchscreen portable media players
Tablet computers introduced in 2013